Tone FM (styled ToneFM) is a community radio station based in Taunton, Somerset, broadcasting to Taunton and the surrounding area on 107.8 FM, 24 hours a day. It was granted a community radio licence by Ofcom in April 2012, with its first broadcast on Thursday 28 February 2013 presented by Darren Daley, who was the station's manager. Being a nonprofit organisation, Tone FM's presenters are all volunteers with guests sourced from the local community. The Tone FM studios are situated on the first floor of the historic Market House, in the centre of the County Town.

Tone FM took on new management in November 2021, with a new Community Interest Company being formed named 'Tone Community Media Group CIC' headed up by the current station manager Patch Jobson. In 2022 the station was awarded a small-scale DAB multiplex by Ofcom, with a planned switch on date of early 2024.

References

External links
Tone FM

Community radio stations in the United Kingdom
Radio stations in Somerset
Taunton